Central Range, Central Mountains, or Central Mountain Range may refer to several ranges of mountains, including:

 Central Range, New Guinea
 Central Range, Taiwan
 Central Range, Trinidad and Tobago
 Central Range, Venezuela

See also
 Central Ranges
 Central Ranges (wine)
 Central Ranges xeric scrub
 Cordillera Central (disambiguation), Spanish for "Central Range"

uk:Кордильєра-Сентраль